Abul Ahsan (28 December 1936 – 7 December 2008) was a Bangladeshi diplomat.

Education
Ahsan secured first class in M.A in economics from the Dhaka University (1959) and M.A in international relations from the Fletcher School of Law and Diplomacy (1962).  He stood first in the Civil and Foreign Services examination of Pakistan and joined the Foreign Service in 1961 and held several diplomatic positions. He completed his secondary school certificate from Noakhali Zilla School.

Career
After Bangladesh's independence Ahsan served in the Bangladeshi Foreign Service for 34 years, ending his career as the Bangladeshi Ambassador to Washington, DC.  He served as the country's Ambassador and Deputy Permanent Representative to the UN Ambassador to Poland, Italy, Pakistan and the United States (1991–93). He was the first secretary-general of the South Asian Association for Regional Cooperation (SAARC) (1987–89) as well as Foreign Secretary of Bangladesh (1989–91).  He was one of the 15 members of the Council of Eminent Persons established by the Summit meeting of the Organization of Islamic Countries (OIC) in 1994 to report on the working of the specialized bodies of the organization. From 1996 to 1999, he served as a member of the Executive Board of the United Nations Educational Scientific and Cultural Organization (UNESCO).

Ahsan served as vice-president at the Independent University Bangladesh . He was chairperson of the Fair Election Monitoring Alliance (FEMA) and was involved in governance and election-related activities for several years, and also held the position of President of Center for Democracy a citizen's organization devoted to the promotion of good governance and democracy.

He represented Bangladesh at a large number of meetings and conferences including UN General Assembly and Security Council Sessions, Summit and Ministerial level meetings of the Commonwealth, the Non-aligned Movement and the Organization of Islamic Conference (OIC).

He is the author of the book SAARC: A Perspective and jointly edited two publications by Independent University Bangladesh entitled Education in a Rapidly Changing World: Focus on Bangladesh and Indigenous Peoples of Bangladesh. He co-chaired a study conducted by the Asia Foundation which was published in 2004 under the title America's role in Asia.

He died on 7 December 2008 after going into cardiac arrest.

References

1936 births
2008 deaths
Bangladeshi diplomats
Secretaries General of the South Asian Association for Regional Cooperation
The Fletcher School at Tufts University alumni
University of Dhaka alumni
Ambassadors of Bangladesh to the United States
High Commissioners of Bangladesh to Pakistan